The UK Battery Industrialisation Centre (UK BIC) is a research centre in the United Kingdom, to develop new electrical batteries, for the British automotive industry.

History
Funding is being provided by United Kingdom Research and Innovation (UKRI). It was announced on 29 November 2017.

Location
The UKBIC facility is located outside Coventry, adjacent to Coventry airport and about half a mile east of the junction between the A46 and A45. This is just outside the city boundary, in the extreme north of Warwick District, Warwickshire.

References

External links
 

2020 establishments in England
Automotive industry in the United Kingdom
Engineering research institutes
Research institutes in Warwickshire
Warwick District